"Pride" is a song written by Wayne Walker and Irene Stanton. It was first recorded by American country music artist Ray Price, whose version became a major hit. Price's version was released on January 7, 1962, where it peaked at No. 5 on Billboard's Hot Country charts.

Charts

Jeannie Seely version

Jeannie Seely recorded the song on her album Can I Sleep in Your Arms/Lucky Ladies in November 1972 where it charted at No. 47.

Charts

Janie Fricke version

"Pride" was then recorded by American country music artist Janie Fricke.  It was released in February 1981 as the second single from her album I'll Need Someone to Hold Me When I Cry.  The song reached #12 on the Billboard Hot Country Singles chart and #1 on the RPM Country Tracks chart in Canada.

Charts

Cover versions by other artists

Anita Bryant (1963)
Gerrie Lynn (1966)
Dean Martin (August 1967)
Tommy Hooker (2012)
Justin Trevino (May 9, 2017)
Doug Jernigan (instrumental) (1978)
Mike Headrick (instrumental) (2014)

References

1981 singles
1980 songs
Janie Fricke songs
Song recordings produced by Jim Ed Norman
Columbia Records singles
Songs written by Wayne Walker (songwriter)
Ray Price (musician) songs
Song recordings produced by Don Law